Fábio José dos Santos, or simply Fabinho Santos (born June 26, 1973 in Telha), is a Brazilian former player and now football (soccer) manager.

Fabinho Santos played for Vitória, Joinville and Coritiba in the Campeonato Brasileiro.

At the end of the 1998 Campeonato Brasileiro season, Fabinho joined Swiss club Basel's first team during the winter break of their 1997–98 season under head coach Guy Mathez. In this season Fabinho appeared in just two test games, then in the following season he received more playing time. After playing in two test games Fabinho played his domestic league debut for the club in the home game in the St. Jakob Stadium on 15 August 1998 as Basel won 2–0 against Xamax. He scored his first goal for the club on 13 March 1999 in the away game in the Charmilles Stadium. But this goal could not help the team because Basel suffered a 1–2 defeat.

However, under the new head coach Christian Gross, Fabinho was not taken into account as team player and his contract with the club was dissolved during the winter break of their 1999–2000 season. During his short period with the club, Fabinho played a total of 30 games for Basel scoring a total of 9 goals. 16 of these games were in the Nationalliga A and 14 were friendly games. He scored 2 goals in the domestic league, the others were scored during the test games. One test game to be mentioned took place on 1 February 1999 in Saint-Esprit, Martinique. During the club's training camp they played against Stade Spiritain and Fabinho scored four goals as Basel won 7–1.

Fabinho Santos later played for Oita Trinita, Albirex Niigata and Vegalta Sendai in the J1 League.

Club statistics

Honours 
Vitória
 Campeonato Baiano (3): 1992, 1995, 1996

Joinville
 Campeonato Catarinense (1): 2000

Oita Trinita
 J. League Division 2 (1) : 2002

Albirex Niigata
 J. League Division 2 (1) : 2003

References

External links

1973 births
Living people
Brazilian footballers
Association football midfielders
Brazilian expatriate footballers
Expatriate footballers in Japan
Expatriate footballers in Switzerland
Campeonato Brasileiro Série A players
Campeonato Brasileiro Série B players
J1 League players
J2 League players
Swiss Super League players
Campeonato Brasileiro Série C managers
Esporte Clube Vitória players
Joinville Esporte Clube players
FC Basel players
Coritiba Foot Ball Club players
Oita Trinita players
Albirex Niigata players
Esporte Clube Juventude players
Vegalta Sendai players
Joinville Esporte Clube managers
Brazilian football managers
Sportspeople from Sergipe